Tamke-Allan Observatory (TAO)  is an astronomical observatory owned and operated by Roane State Community College.  Dedicated in 1998, it is located in Harriman, Tennessee.

See also 
 List of astronomical observatories

References 
 

Astronomical observatories in Tennessee
Buildings and structures in Roane County, Tennessee